Kabaddi is a 2021 Sri Lankan sports action film directed by Harsha Udakanda and produced by Nishantha Jayawardena for HU Films and Hiruna Creations. It stars Amila Karunanayake and Senali Fonseka in lead roles along with Sriyantha Mendis, Darshan Dharmaraj and Nilmini Kottegoda in supportive roles.

The film had its premiere on 16 April 2021. The film is a remake of 2003 Indian Telugu language film Okkadu (2003).

Cast

Soundtrack
The film consists of three songs.

References

External links 
 Kabaddi on Sinhala Cinema Database
 Kabaddi on Facebook
 Kabaddi on YouTube

Remakes of Sri Lankan films
2021 films
Sports action films
2020s Sinhala-language films
2020s sports films
2021 action films